Çakrazboz is a village in the Amasra District, Bartın Province, Turkey. Its population is 154 (2021).

History 
The name of the village is mentioned as Bozköy in the records of 1907 and as Çakraz Bozköy in the records of 1928.

Geography 
The village is 27 km from Bartın city center and 12 km from Amasra town centre.

References

Villages in Amasra District